"My 16th Apology" is a song by UK pop act Shakespears Sister, released in early 1993 as the fifth and final single from their studio album Hormonally Yours. Due to both members being on hiatus at the time, the single performed poorly, suffering from a lack of promotion. The three B-sides, live performances from their 1992 concert broadcast on BBC Radio, were later included on their 2011 album Live 1992. This was the group's last release until 2019 to feature Marcella Detroit.

Track listing
UK CD single
 "My 16th Apology"
 "Catwoman"
 "Hot Love"
 "Dirty Mind"

Charts

References

1992 songs
1993 singles
London Records singles
Music videos directed by Sophie Muller
Shakespears Sister songs
Song recordings produced by Alan Moulder
Songs written by Marcella Detroit
Songs written by Richard Feldman (songwriter)
Songs written by Siobhan Fahey